Kati Lehtonen (née Pulkkinen, born 6 April 1975) is a Finnish former cross-country skier who competed from 1995 to 2002. She won a bronze medal at the 4 × 5 km relay in the 1997 FIS Nordic World Ski Championships and had her best finish of 16th in two events (5 km + 10 km combined pursuit, 30 km) at those same championships.

Lehtonen's best individual finish at the Winter Olympics was 51st in the 5 km + 10 km combined pursuit at Nagano in 1998. Her only individual victory was in a 5 km event in Finland in 1997.

Cross-country skiing results
All results are sourced from the International Ski Federation (FIS).

Olympic Games

World Championships
 1 medal – (1 bronze)

World Cup

Season standings

Team podiums

 3 podiums 

Note:   Until the 1999 World Championships, World Championship races were included in the World Cup scoring system.

References

External links

1975 births
Living people
Finnish female cross-country skiers
Cross-country skiers at the 1998 Winter Olympics
FIS Nordic World Ski Championships medalists in cross-country skiing
Olympic cross-country skiers of Finland
People from Sulkava
Sportspeople from South Savo